The Edward L. Westbrooke Building is a historic commercial building at 505 Union Street in Jonesboro, Arkansas. It is a two-story brick structure, located across the street from the Craighead County Courthouse on a prominent street corner in downtown Jonesboro. It has pronounced Romanesque styling, with arched windows, a recessed entry at the corner below an engaged rounded tower section. It was built in 1899 to house professional offices on the first level and the local Masonic lodge upstairs.

The building was listed on the National Register of Historic Places in 2003.

See also

National Register of Historic Places listings in Craighead County, Arkansas

References

Office buildings on the National Register of Historic Places in Arkansas
Romanesque Revival architecture in Arkansas
Buildings and structures in Jonesboro, Arkansas
National Register of Historic Places in Craighead County, Arkansas
Commercial buildings completed in 1899